Gillett is an unincorporated community in Karnes County, Texas, United States. According to the Handbook of Texas, the community had an estimated population of 120 in 2000.

Gillett has a post office with the ZIP code 78116. Public education in the community is provided by the Karnes City Independent School District.

References

External links
 

Unincorporated communities in Karnes County, Texas
Unincorporated communities in Texas